Corydon Township is a defunct township in Warren County, Pennsylvania in the United States. The township was merged in 1964 into Mead Township.

History 

Warren County was formed on March 12, 1800 out of Allegheny County, with the original township of Brokenstraw being formed in that October from everything in the county west of the Allegheny River and Conewango Creek; Conewango Township was formed in March 1808 and consisted of the unincorporated eastern half of Warren County. On March 26, 1846, a portion of Corydon Township in McKean County was set off for Warren County.

Philip Tome, a native of Dauphin County, was the first settler in Corydon in 1827 and for many years was interpreter for Seneca chiefs Cornplanter and Governor Blacksnake. The Buffalo, New York, and Philadelphia Railroad opened in 1882 and brought growth to the community, bringing in stores, a hotel, a stave-mill, a pulp company, a spoke factory, a handle factory, a saw mill, a shingle mill, and various other industries.

Population of (West) Corydon peaked in 1900; while it received a modest boost in population in the 1890s, it did not experience the massive boom and bust that its neighboring townships along the Allegheny did. It was in a state of persistent decline through the first half of the 20th century and had already shrunk to less than a third of its peak by 1960. Construction of the Kinzua Dam caused the resulting Allegheny Reservoir to submerge the remaining communities in Corydon Township. The little remaining land that remained above water was annexed to Mead Township in 1964.

Geography 
Corydon Township was located on a strip of land in the extreme northeastern corner of Warren County, and was bounded by the Town of South Valley, New York on the north; (East) Corydon in McKean County on the east, Kinzua Township to the south; and the Allegheny River on the west. A ferry service (Webb's Ferry) connected Corydon with Elk Township, Warren County, Pennsylvania across the river. The ferry's western terminus in Elk Township remains in use, maintained by the Allegheny National Forest.

References

Sources 
 
 

Populated places established in 1827
Townships in Warren County, Pennsylvania
Former townships in Pennsylvania
1827 establishments in Pennsylvania
1964 disestablishments in Pennsylvania